2 Corinthians 9 is the ninth chapter of the Second Epistle to the Corinthians in the New Testament of the Christian Bible. It is authored by Paul the Apostle and Timothy (2 Corinthians 1:1) in Macedonia in 55–56 CE.

This chapter continues "the topic of generous giving"  commenced in the previous chapter. The eighteenth-century German theologian Johann Salomo Semler suggested that this chapter was a separate letter later inserted into 2 Corinthians. The Jerusalem Bible notes the possibility that chapter 9 was "a short note to the churches of Achaia, being inserted here subsequently to follow the instructions on the same subject ... in chapter 8. The Pulpit Commentary rejects this suggestion.

Text
The original text was written in Koine Greek. This chapter is divided into 15 verses.

Textual witnesses
Some early manuscripts containing the text of this chapter are:
Papyrus 46 (~AD 200)
Codex Vaticanus (325–350)
Codex Sinaiticus (330–360)
Codex Alexandrinus (400–440)
Codex Ephraemi Rescriptus (~450)
Codex Freerianus (~450; extant verses 1,7–8,15)
Codex Claromontanus (~550)

Old Testament references
2 Corinthians 9:7:  (Septuagint only)
2 Corinthians 9:9: Psalm

Verse 7
 Each one must give as he has decided in his heart, not reluctantly or under compulsion, for God loves a cheerful giver.
"not reluctantly or under compulsion" (NKJV: "not grudgingly or of necessity"): that is "of his own will and free choice", from one's very heart; not as directed and forced by others.
"For God loves a cheerful giver": The Jewish phrase "with a cheerful countenance", or elsewhere "with a cheerful heart" is from the quotation: "He that doth the commandment, i.e. alms, let him do it "with a cheerful heart"."
 in Septuagint has "God blesses a cheerful man, and a giver", which may be what Paul refers to.

Verse 9
As it is written:
"He has dispersed abroad, He has given to the poor;
His righteousness remains forever."
Citing .

Verse 15 
Thanks be to God for His indescribable gift!
Paul knew that all the magnificent promises of God were guaranteed through the perfect sacrifice of Christ (cf. ). Thus, that "indescribable free gift" would include all the goodness and loyal love that God would extend to mankind through Jesus. Indeed, that gift is so awe-inspiring that it cannot be fully described in human terms.

See also
Macedonia
Titus
Related Bible parts: Psalm 112, Proverbs 11, Proverbs 19, Matthew 10, Luke 6, Luke 21

References

Sources

External links
 King James Bible - Wikisource
English Translation with Parallel Latin Vulgate
Online Bible at GospelHall.org (ESV, KJV, Darby, American Standard Version, Bible in Basic English)
Multiple bible versions at Bible Gateway (NKJV, NIV, NRSV etc.)

2 Corinthians 9